The Iraq national under-17 football team represents Iraq in international football competitions in AFC U-17 Asian Cup which Iraq holds 5 titles, as well as any other international football tournaments. The team is controlled by the governing body for football in Iraq, Iraq Football Association (IFA).

Matches

Recent results and fixtures
The following is a list of match results in the last 12 months, as well as any future matches that have been scheduled.
Legend

Coaching staff

Players

Current squad
 The following 23 players were called up for the  2022 Arab Cup U-17:
 Caps and goals are correct as of: 22 September 2019, after the match against .
 Caps and goals are correct excluding friendly matches and unrecognized tournaments such as Arab U-17 Championship.

Recent callups
 The following players have also been called up to Iraqi squad for the last 12 months.

Coaches

Competitive record

FIFA U-17 World Cup

AFC U-17 Asian Cup

WAFF U-16 Championship

Arab Cup U-17

See also
Iraq national football team
Iraq national under-23 football team
Iraq national under-20 football team

References

External links
Official website
Official Iraq national football team on FIFA.com

Under-17
Asian national under-17 association football teams